Landenberger may refer to:

 Christian Landenberger, (1862-1927), German painter
 George Landenberger, United States Navy Captain and the 23rd Governor of American Samoa
 Paul Landenberger, German watchmaker

See also 
 Landenberg
 Landenberg Bridge
 Landenberg, Pennsylvania